Aenetus tegulatus is a moth of the family Hepialidae. It is known from south-eastern Papua New Guinea, the Northern Territory and Queensland.

Young larvae feed on dead leaves.  Older larvae bore in the stems of saplings of various plants, including Allocasuarina littoralis and Glochidion disparides.

References

Moths described in 1888
Hepialidae